27 Mavalli Circle is a 1986 Indian Kannada language thriller film directed, written, produced and enacted by T. N. Narasimhan. The film is adapted from Narasimhan's stage play of the same name which starred Lohithaswa in the lead role. The rest of the cast includes Devaraj in his film debut, Umashri, and Kalpana Reddy. The film's score is by L. Vaidyanathan. The story is based on Frederick Knott's 1966 play Wait Until Dark.

Cast
 T. N. Narasimhan
 Kalpana Reddy
 Umashri
 Devaraj
 Avinash
 H. G. Somashekar Rao
 Master Jayanth
 Baby Rashmi Rai
 Krishne Gowda

References

External links
 

1986 films
1980s Kannada-language films
Indian films based on plays
Indian thriller films
1986 thriller films